Samir Khullar (born 29 February 1976), better known as Sugar Sammy, is a Canadian stand-up comedian, actor, writer, and producer from Montreal, Quebec. Being fluently quadrilingual, his is comedy routines are delivered in English and French, and sometimes in Punjabi and Hindi.

His comedy includes cultural, social, and political themes, often improvising with the crowd during shows. He has been performing for over 25 years and has toured in over 32 countries, including Canada, the US, France, Singapore, Dubai, Saudi Arabia, and India, with over 1,900 shows to date. His 2012–2016 bilingual "You're Gonna Rire" (and its French-language counterpart, "") tour alone sold 372,000 tickets and culminated in a free outdoor show attended by 115,000 people, a record for the Just For Laughs Festival.

In addition to his stand-up tours, Sugar Sammy is a judge on La France a un Incroyable talent, France’s version of America’s Got Talent, broadcast on M6, one of France’s biggest networks. 

Among his awards, Sugar Sammy has won "Comedian of the Year" at French daily newspaper Le Parisien’s Gala Les étoiles, and 3 Olivier awards in Quebec, including the "Comedian of the Year" award and "Olivier of the Year", for his take on life in multilingual Quebec. 

In reference to Sammy, GQ France once declared that “the funniest man in France is a Quebecer” and France’s renowned television show Quotidien crowned him the “new king of comedy.” He has been the subject of an in-depth profile in the New York Times, where he was featured on the front page of the international edition; the newspaper called him a “fearless comic with a talent for provoking both laughter and outrage.” Less than a year later, the popular comedian was featured on the front page of the Arts section of the Washington Post. He has also been anointed one of The Hollywood Reporter’s “Ten Comics to Watch'' and has been interviewed extensively for Canada's award-winning W5 current-affairs TV show.

Early life
Samir Khullar was born on February 29, 1976, and raised in the Côte-des-Neiges neighbourhood of Montreal, Quebec; he worked in his parents' convenience store. At the age of eight, he saw Eddie Murphy's 1983 comedy special Delirious and credits the experience as being a defining moment in his life. From then on, he knew what he wanted to do. Khullar also names Martin Lawrence, Chris Rock, and Dave Chappelle as comedic influences.

Attending  for high school, where he gained early stage experiences, Khullar attended Marianopolis College while occasionally performing at open-mic nights at the Comedy Works and the Comedy Zone. Continuing to work for recognition on the comedy circuit, he attended McGill University in cultural studies while working as a nightclub promoter, which is where he got his stage moniker.

Career 
Khullar blends polished material with improvisational comedy and interacts with audience members sitting near the stage. The New York Times called him "a fearless comic with a talent for provoking both laughter and outrage." The Hollywood Reporter selected him as one of their "Ten Comics to Watch".

Appearances 
Khullar has performed on television several times since 2004.

On August 21, 2006, Khullar opened for Dave Chappelle at Toronto's Massey Hall. That same year, he taped his Comedy Now! special, which aired in Canada on the Comedy Network, CTV, and A, as well as in the United States on Comedy Central.

He appeared at the Just For Laughs Festival seven years in a row and was the first comedian ever to perform in all three of the English, French, and Hindi Toronto editions of the Festival. On one of the most electric nights of the 2016 edition of Just For Laughs Festival, his 8th presence at the festival, Sugar Sammy capped off his 420-show tour with one last performance of his hit show You're Gonna Rire in front of a crowd of 115,000 in Montreal.

In July 2017, Sammy made his triumphant return to the Just For Laughs Festival to host 2 evenings of Sugar Sammy's International Gala. In hosting the gala, Sugar Sammy joined legends and comedy stars such as Don Rickles, Steve Martin, Tina Fey, Jimmy Fallon, Bill Maher and Bill Burr. Fresh from hosting two critically acclaimed sold-out Galas at the 35th edition of the festival, Sugar Sammy went on to host the 17th edition of the annual Just For Laughs Canadian Comedy Tour in the autumn of 2017.

He has also appeared at the Sydney Comedy Festival, the Cape Town Comedy Festival, and was invited to the inaugural Johannesburg Comedy Festival in 2009.

International career 
Sugar Sammy has toured in Canada, the United States, France, Belgium, Switzerland, England, Australia, Germany, Ireland, the Netherlands, Hong Kong, Thailand, the Philippines, China, India, Bahrain, Jordan, Qatar, Egypt, Kuwait, Abu Dhabi, Lebanon, Singapore, Malaysia, Saudi Arabia, Bahrain, Northern Ireland, Dubai, Haiti New Zealand and South Africa, where his one-man show sold 15,000 tickets.

He is the first artist chosen by Comedy Central India to tour their country, visiting Mumbai, Bangalore and Delhi in March 2013 with his English/Hindi/Punjabi comedy show.

Sugar Sammy's international TV credits include his own one-hour TV special on Showtime Arabia entitled, Sugar Sammy Live in Dubai, which aired in 14 countries; headlining two TV shows for Showtime, Minority Rules and Friday Night Live; and appearances on CBC, Comedy Now on CTV, The Comedy Network (Canada), The Comedy Channel (Australia), and Dutch TV.

Since 2016, Sugar Sammy has been performing his growing one-man show in France, where GC magazine published a piece saying that the funniest man in France is Quebecois. He has been touring the country as well as performing 3 nights a week at the Alhambra Theatre in Paris until December 2018. From there, he was named as one of the judges on La France a un incroyable talent, the French equivalent of America's Got Talent.

In Spring/Summer 2017, Sugar Sammy toured the US, performing 40 shows in 7 American cities, including New York, San Jose, Seattle, Atlanta, Austin, Naples and Dallas.

In July 2018, between his runs in France, Sugar Sammy set off for Malaysia, where he performed two nights of tapings for Comedy Central: Stand-Up Asia!. The tapings aired in 18 Asian countries on August 14. Following the tapings, he took off for Singapore to perform his one-man show.

Francophone career 
In 2007, Sugar Sammy appeared in Quebec's Le Show Raisonnable, and in 2009 performed in the French edition of the Just for Laughs Festival. His point of view concerning Quebec politics and culture from the perspective of a minority earned him a standing ovation and "The Revelation of the Year" award. In 2010, he made headlines again by presenting an award alongside Quebec political leader Pauline Marois. He teased her incessantly about sovereignty and the language debate.

Sugar Sammy wanted a stronger presence in Quebec, and his bilingual show You're Gonna Rire became his first tour of Quebec in 2012. In the four and a half years since its debut, You're Gonna Rire became a hit with little precedent, the most successful solo comedy show Montreal has ever seen, and one that catapulted its creator from merely being a successful comic to becoming a bonafide star.

In 2014, he once again won the Olivier for Comedian of the Year at the 16th annual gala, and Apple chose him to perform in their TV ads in French Canada. In May 2015, he was nominated again, for a third year in a row, for the Olivier for Comedian of the Year.

During December 2014, he ran a billboard ad in the Montreal Metro stating that "For Christmas, I'd like a complaint from the Office de la langue française", in reference to the Quebec government organization that requires businesses to run ads in French. After a complaint was received, the English text was blacked out and replaced by "" ('For Christmas, I got a complaint from the Office de la langue française'). This marketing campaign, designed by Sid Lee, garnered much attention from Quebec media and was the centre of heated debates between different linguistic communities in the province.

In July 2016, after setting records in Quebec, selling the most tickets to a debut one-man show in Quebec history, Sugar Sammy announced that, upon the completion of You're Gonna Rire, he'd be heading to France in an effort to conquer that particular market.

In fall 2016, Sugar Sammy set off for Paris and launched a new show geared specifically for a French audience. His show opened March 1, 2017, at l’Européen in Paris. New to the French scene, Sugar Sammy quickly became one of the best selling shows in the city. Sugar Sammy received the top critic score, the 3Ts from Télérama. More shows were added in Paris until the end of December 2017. In 2018, Sugar Sammy added more dates in Paris as well as touring the rest of France, Belgium and Switzerland.

In July 2018, M6 network announced that Sugar Sammy would be one of the judges on season 13 of 'La France a un incroyable talent', the French equivalent of America's Got Talent.

Créa 
The 2012 Grand Prix Créa, which recognizes Quebec's best advertisement of the year, has been awarded to the Montreal advertising agency Sid Lee for Vidéotron's English-language Prank Calls campaign featuring Sugar Sammy. Sugar Sammy also won the best actor award for his performance. The campaign aimed at showing its customer-service employees' patience and efficiency, while also mentioning the company's various services. In each spot, Sammy called Videotron's customer service with a bizarre problem designed to test the employees' abilities while highlighting a particular aspect of Vidéotron's services. "The writing and direction are perfect," the jury explained. "Because Sugar Sammy delivers the goods so masterfully, viewers understand everything and laugh a lot." According to Claude Foisy, Videotron's Vice President of Brand Management, "These are actual calls answered by real employees, who demonstrate their dedication to their mission of providing their customers with the best possible experience."

In 2015, Sugar Sammy won big again at Quebec's CREA Awards, with five CREA Awards. These include the Grand Prix Campagne Intégrée, one of the night's most prestigious awards. Other awards included Indoor Billboards (Sugargate), TV spot (TV campaign Offrez Sugar Sammy) and Radio Campaign (Sugar Sammy). The campaign was produced again in collaboration with Sid Lee. The campaign to promote comedy shows You're Gonna Rire and En français SVP!, featuring Sugar Sammy, highlighted what he does best: making fun of life in Montreal.

One-man shows and other productions

Down With the Brown

After traveling across the globe to perform in many comedy festivals and clubs, Sugar Sammy hit the road again in 2007 to present around the world his first one-man show Down with the Brown. He tackled everything from life in Quebec to his take on sex and race from the perspective of an Indo-Canadian. His debut comedy album followed, Down With the Brown. It was released on January 15, 2008, and coincided with a Canadian tour.

Live in Concert 
After setting attendance records around the world for sold-out shows in four languages—English, French, Punjabi and Hindi—Sugar Sammy brings the house down across Canada from February through March 2009 with his show Sugar Sammy Live in Concert. He drew on everything from arranged marriages in his own Indian ancestry to his view on deviant sex, drugs and modern-day relationships. The tour ended in Montreal in March 2009. He then released the DVD Sugar Sammy Live in Concert: Direct from Montreal, which was the number-one best-selling comedy DVD on Amazon.ca for five straight weeks.

You're Gonna Rire and En Français SVP  
In 2011, Sugar Sammy performed his (then) one-night-only bilingual show, You're Gonna Rire, in a language called "Franglais", an ode to the common Montreal experience of switching between English and French throughout the day. In an unprecedented experiment, You're Gonna Rire became the first large-scale Anglo-Franco comedy show in Canada. It was described as "50.5 per cent English, 49.5 per cent French" as a reference to the 1995 referendum results.

Initially conceived as a single night at the 1,300-seat Olympia Theater, tickets sold so fast that it extended to 45 performances, with a total of 53,000 tickets sold by April 2013.

In 2012, the bilingual show was also transformed into a fully French-language show entitled  ('In French, Please!').

Sugar Sammy continued to perform both shows in Montreal, and the French show throughout the province of Quebec. The shows ranked as the 30th largest-grossing tour in North America according to Pollstar magazine in May 2013. Two years later, the combined shows had sold over 230,000 tickets, with over 100 sold-out shows performed at the Olympia theatre in Montreal alone.

In May 2014, Billboard magazine named Sugar Sammy the top-selling Canadian tour of the 12 months ending April 12, 2014. By the end of the year, he became Admission.com's overall Best Selling Show of 2014, with over 300,000 tickets sold.

On July 28, 2016, Sugar Sammy headlined his last "You're Gonna Rire" show in front of a record-breaking crowd of 115 000 people at the Place des Festivals in Montreal, a free outdoor gig that was part of the Just For Laughs Festival. Before the grand finale, Sugar Sammy had performed both shows 420 times, and sold 371,509 tickets.

In May 2018, "You're Gonna Rire" and "En Français S.V.P." were released on DVD and digitally on iTunes, Google Play and YouTube. Sugar Sammy celebrated the launch by performing five shows at the Olympia Theatre and giving out numbered, limited edition, DVD box sets to the 6,500 fans who attended the event.

Sugar Sammy (France)  

Sugar Sammy developed and tested his show "" at Le Point Virgule in Paris, from September 2016 through December 2016. Sugar Sammy then moved his tried-and-tested show to a larger venue in Paris, l'Européen, and performed his new French show, titled Sugar Sammy, four nights a week in 2017 from March 1 to April 29.

A pure "American stand-up" style show, with just a microphone and no censorship, Sugar Sammy's act included his point of view as a world-travelled Canadian now living in Paris. Previously unknown in France, Sugar Sammy's show at l'Européen quickly became one of the top selling shows in Paris. After rave reviews from critics and by popular demand, Sugar Sammy announced 25 more shows in Paris, set to perform between November 9, 2017 and December 31, 2017 at l'Alhambra, moving from a 350-seat theatre, to a 600-seat theatre.

After selling over 25,000 tickets and presenting over 134 performances in France, Sugar Sammy was dubbed the “Best of 2017” by Paris Match magazine, who referred to his show as “grand art”. Thanks to the success of his first run, Sugar Sammy continued his residency at the Alhambra Theatre until December 2018, as well as touring the rest of France, Belgium and Switzerland.

In July 2018, the M6 television network announced that Sugar Sammy will be one of the judges on season 13 of Freemantle Media's La France a un incroyable talent, the French equivalent of America's Got Talent, reaching 3.5 to 4 million weekly viewers.

Reviews from French Media:

 Quotidien: “Le new king of comedy.”
 Télérama: “”
 Paris Match: “”
 GQ France: “” ('The funniest Frenchman is a Quebecer.')
 C à vous: “”
 Konbini: “”

HBO Canada special 
Sugar Sammy's biggest TV credit is his 72-minute HBO Canada special, which premiered on June 14, 2009, across Canada and ran continuously throughout summer.

It became one of the network's highest rated TV specials and a first for any Canadian. The special was eventually acquired by Air Canada and was aired on all international and domestic flights. Due to popular demand, the special was eventually released on DVD, where it went straight to #1 on the stand-up comedy best-sellers list on Amazon Canada.

Ces gars-là TV series 
In February 2014, Sugar Sammy and French-speaking comedian Simon-Olivier Fecteau launched the ten-episode series Ces gars-là on Quebec's French V network, starring the two comedians, directed by Fecteau, and written by the two principals along with India Desjardins.

A buddy comedy à la Wedding Crashers and Swingers, inspired by the lives of the two writer-comedians, the series follows their searches for love, their relationships with their families and how they deal with the rules of their own friendship.

Unusually, Sammy's English-speaking fans have followed him to a show on a French channel. The successful series was prolonged into a second season.

As the show wrapped its second season in April 2015, it was renewed for a third.

Filmography

Accomplishments 

 Voted "funniest comedian" by the readers of the Montreal Mirror for three years in a row
 Winner of the 2009 COCA (Canadian Organization for College Activities) Award for Best Comedian
 Voted as one of the top ten "most desirable men" by the readers of the Montreal Mirror
 Named one of the top 25 "Sexy and Successful" Indian artists by Anokhi Magazine
 Rumour's Restaurant & Comedy Club in Winnipeg named a sandwich in Sammy's honour, The Sugar Sammy Sammie (Butter Chicken on a Bun)
 Nominated for Best Male Stand-up at the 2009 Canadian Comedy Awards
 Nominated for the category of Favorite Comedian by Masala! Mehndi! Masti!
 Recipient of the 2009 La Revelation de Juste Pour Rire (the 2009 French discovery of The Just For Laughs Festival )
 Named one of the Top Ten Rising Comedy Talents on the planet by The Hollywood Reporter
 Awarded the 2010 COCA awards
 Ranked No. 58 in the annual list of the Top 100 Men of 2009 by Divine magazine
 Featured in the 27th edition of the Juste le meilleur des galas 2009 DVD; a greatest-hits compilations by the French version of the Just For Laughs Comedy Festival
Nominated in the categories "Discovery of the Year" and "Best Comedic Act" for his routine les Quebecquois for the 12th annual Le Gala Les Olivier, which honours Quebec's top comedians.
 Recipient of the 2010 Prix québécois de la citoyenneté, which honors individuals, enterprises and organizations for their commitment and contribution to making Quebec a more pluralistic and inclusive society
Recipient of the 2010 'Le Prix Umayyad'ambassadeur et rayonnement' presented by the Societe des Grands Citoyens for his contribution as an international ambassador for Canada
 The first Canadian to have a special on HBO Canada, which became one of the top-rated specials on that channel
 Sugar Sammy's HBO special became the #1 bestselling DVD on Amazon.ca
 First comedian to perform at Just for Laughs in English, French, Hindi and Punjabi

Awards

References

External links
 Official Website
 Facebook
 Twitter
 Instagram
 YouTube
 

Anglophone Quebec people
Canadian stand-up comedians
Canadian people of Indian descent
Living people
People from Côte-des-Neiges–Notre-Dame-de-Grâce
Comedians from Montreal
Male actors from Montreal
People from Hampstead, Quebec
1976 births
La France a un incroyable talent